For the Winter Olympics, there are eight venues that start with the letter 'T', three venues that start with the letter 'U', two venues that start with the letter 'V', no venues that start with the letters 'X' and 'Y', and two venues that start with the letter 'Z'.

T

U

V

W

X
There are no venues that start with the letter 'X'. This includes the 2014 Winter Olympics in Sochi.

Y
There are no venues that start with the letter 'Y'. This includes the 2014 Winter Olympics in Sochi.

Z

References